McShan is an unincorporated community in Pickens County, Alabama, United States. It was named to honor the McShan Lumber Company, which moved to the location in 1844.

Geography

References

Unincorporated communities in Alabama
Unincorporated communities in Pickens County, Alabama